The E. J. "Lionel" Grizzaffi Bridge is a cantilever bridge in the U.S. state of Louisiana which carries US 90 over the Atchafalaya River between Berwick and Morgan City.

The bridge will eventually be part of the I-49 extension between Lafayette and New Orleans once the highway is brought up to freeway standards.

References

Road bridges in Louisiana
U.S. Route 90
Bridges of the United States Numbered Highway System
Bridges completed in 1975
Cantilever bridges in the United States
Buildings and structures in St. Mary Parish, Louisiana